Joanna Bacon is a British architect, who was shortlisted for the Woman Architect of the Year award in 2015.  She has worked at Allies and Morrison since 1988 and is a managing partner.

Biography 

Joanna Bacon studied at Robinson College, Cambridge under Bob Allies from Allies and Morrison. She completed her studies in 1980.

Bacon joined Allies and Morrison in 1988 and became a Partner in 2001. She was the partner in charge of work on the BBC Media Village, the Royal Festival Hall refurbishment and 100 Bishopsgate project (completed in 2011).

References

External links 

1962 births
Conservation architects
Alumni of Robinson College, Cambridge
Living people
21st-century English architects
British women architects